Attack & Release is the fifth studio album by American rock duo The Black Keys. It was produced by Danger Mouse and was released on April 1, 2008. The sessions saw the band transitioning away from their "homemade" ethos to record-making; not only was it the first time that the band completed an album in a professional studio, but it was also the first time they hired an outside producer to work on a record.

Leading up to the recording sessions, drummer Patrick Carney wanted to change the sound of his drums and envisioned two approaches to doing so. He said, "I had one of the Bonham reissue kits and I set that up in a live room. And then I knew I wanted a kind of '70s dead sound too, so I did the whole 'towels on the drums' thing." Attack & Release features a guest appearance by Marc Ribot, who used to play alongside Carney's uncle in Tom Waits' band.

Attack & Release debuted at number 14 on the Billboard 200. The album was ranked 83rd on Rolling Stones list of the greatest albums of the 2000s. The song "I Got Mine" was number 23 on Rolling Stones list of the 100 Best Songs of 2008. In 2012, the album was certified gold in Canada, and gold in the U.S. in 2016.

Track listing 

Notes
 "Things Ain't Like They Used to Be" features a duet between Dan Auerbach and then 17-year-old bluegrass/country singer Jessica Lea Mayfield.

Personnel 
The Black Keys
Dan Auerbach – vocals, guitars, bass guitar;
Patrick Carney – drums, percussion;

Additional musicians
Danger Mouse (Brian Burton) – Hohner bass 3, Korg and Moog synthesizers, piano, organ
Carla Monday – harmony vocals on "I Got Mine", "Psychotic Girl" and "Lies"
Jessica Lea Mayfield – harmony vocals on "Things Ain't Like They Used to Be"
Ralph Carney – jaw harp on "I Got Mine", contra bass clarinet on "Lies", clarinet on "Remember When", flute and concert bass harmonica on "Same Old Thing"
Marc Ribot – guitar solo on "Lies" and "So He Won't Break", rhythm guitar on "Remember When (Side A)", and slide guitar on "Oceans and Streams"

Charts

References 

2008 albums
The Black Keys albums
Albums produced by Danger Mouse (musician)